Tolga Ciğerci (born 23 March 1992) is a Turkish professional footballer who plays as a defensive midfielder for German  club Hertha BSC. He represented Germany at under-19 and under-20 level, before switching his allegiance to Turkey.

Club career
Ciğerci signed a three-year deal on 14 April 2014 with Hertha BSC to move permanently, after a full season on loan.

Ciğerci signed a three-year contract with Turkish club Galatasaray on 8 August 2016 for an initial fee of €3 million.

On 31 January 2023, Ciğerci returned to Hertha BSC on a 1.5-year deal.

International career
Ciğerci played for Germany U-19 and U-20 teams, however, he chose to represent Turkey at senior level and was called up by manager Fatih Terim for Turkey's friendly match against Russia on 31 August 2016 and subsequently made his debut in a World Cup 2018 qualifying 1-1 tie against Croatia.

Personal life
His younger brother, Tolcay Ciğerci, is also a midfielder, and made his professional debut for Hamburger SV in 2014.

Career statistics

Honours
Galatasaray
Süper Lig: 2017–18

References

External links 
 
 
 
 
 
 

1992 births
Living people
People from Nordenham
Citizens of Turkey through descent
German people of Turkish descent
Turkish footballers
German footballers
Footballers from Lower Saxony
Association football midfielders
Turkey international footballers
Germany youth international footballers
Bundesliga players
Regionalliga players
Süper Lig players
VfL Wolfsburg players
VfL Wolfsburg II players
Borussia Mönchengladbach players
Borussia Mönchengladbach II players
Hertha BSC players
Hertha BSC II players
Galatasaray S.K. footballers
Fenerbahçe S.K. footballers
İstanbul Başakşehir F.K. players
MKE Ankaragücü footballers